"Geh nicht wenn du kommst" is a song by Austrian recording artist Christina Stürmer. It was written by Hannes Strasser and produced by Alexander Kahr for her debut studio album Freier Fall (2003). Released as the album's second single, the song was not as well-received as her previous single, "Ich lebe", but it did reach number five on the Austrian Singles Chart. As with most of Stürmer's previous singles, "Geh nicht wenn du kommst" was later re-recorded for her international debut album, Schwarz Weiss, released in 2005.

Formats and track listings

Charts

Weekly charts

Year-end charts

References

External links
 

2003 singles
Christina Stürmer songs
2003 songs